Ruanoho decemgitatus, the longfinned triplefin, is a species of fish in the family Tripterygiidae. It is endemic to New Zealand. It is marine fish that occurs in shallow water (maximum depth 10 m) on rocks and cobbles on silty reefs in semi-sheltered areas. It can grow to  total length.

References

decemgitatus
Endemic fauna of New Zealand
Marine fish of New Zealand
Taxa named by Frank Edward Clarke
Fish described in 1879